Calliostoma grohi is a species of sea snail, a marine gastropod mollusc in the family Calliostomatidae.

Description

Distribution
This marine species occurs off the Saya de Malha Bank, Western Indian Ocean.

References

 Stratmann D. & Stahlschmidt P. (2007) Description of a new species of Calliostoma (Trochoidea: Calliostomatidae) from the Saya de Malha Bank. Visaya 2(2): 3–6.

External links
 

grohi
Gastropods described in 2007